floppyfw was a Linux distribution running BusyBox to provide a firewall/gateway/router on a single bootable floppy disk, but was later available in CD format.

Reviews concluded that it was a very simple and reliable gateway/firewall that could be established on small to medium-sized networks at low cost and with ease. One independent study concluded that it was " best possible security provided by a floppy-based firewall" for the repurposing of old, redundant hardware into Linux-based firewalls or routers.

Requirements
 Intel 80386SX or better
 two network interface cards
 1.44MB floppy drive
 12MByte of RAM

Features
Floppyfw's features include:
 Access lists
 IP-masquerading (network address translation)
 Connection tracked packet filtering
 Quite advanced routing
 Traffic shaping
 PPPoE
 Very simple packaging system. Is used for editors, PPP, VPN, traffic shaping and whatever comes up
 Logging through klogd/syslogd, both local and remote
 Serial support for console over serial port
 DHCP server and DNS cache for internal networks

References

External links
 floppyfw main web page

Free routing software
Gateway/routing/firewall distribution
Discontinued Linux distributions
Linux distributions